The 2022 Runnymede Borough Council election took place on 5 May 2022 to elect one-third of members of the Runnymede Borough Council in England. This was on the same day as other local elections in the U.K.

Since its first election in 1973, the council has been under Conservative control, apart from a short period between 1996 and 1998 when it was under no overall control. In the previous election in 2021, the Conservative Party retained control of the council, winning 9 out of 13 seats and holding their majority, albeit reduced to 4. Liberal Democrat and Labour Co-op Party councillors, are also present on the council. Since that election, one Conservative councillor, Mike Kusneraitis, had defected to become an independent and was defending his seat.

Following the election, the majority Conservatives lost four seats and reducing their majority to seven, with Labour gaining two, Green Party of England and Wales gaining one, and independent candidate Andrea Berardi picking up his seat from the Conseratives also.

The election occurred in the national context of the Partygate scandal and the cost of living crisis.

Results

Ward Results

Addlestone North 

|}

Addlestone South 

|}

Chertsey Riverside

|}

Chertsey St. Ann's 

|}

Egham Hythe

|}

Egham Town

|}

Englefield Green East

|}

Englefield Green West

|}

Longcross, Lyne and Chertsey South

|}

New Haw

|}

Ottershaw

|}

Thorpe 

|}

Virginia Water

|}

Woodham and Rowtown

|}

References

Runnymede Borough Council elections
2022 English local elections
May 2022 events in the United Kingdom